The 2013-14 Ligue 1 season was the 51st of the competition of the first-tier football in Senegal and the sixthprofessional season.  The tournament was organized by the Senegalese Football Federation.  The season began on 14 December and finished earlier on 21 June.  It was the sixth season labelled as a "League" ("Ligue" in French).  AS Pikine won their only title, and a year later would compete in the 2015 CAF Champions League.  Olympique de Ngor the winner of the 2014 Senegalese Cup participated in the 2015 CAF Confederation Cup the following season.

The seasoning would have feature 14 clubs being reduced to 16 last season and saw the total matches reduced to 182 and fewer goals which numbered 344.

Diambars FC again was the defending team of the title.

Participating clubs

Information about the clubs

Overview
The league was contested by 14 teams.

League standings

Source : |title= 2013-14 Senegalese Ligue 1 season at the FIFA Website

References

External links
 2014 Senegalese season at RSSSF
 Standings at FIFA site

Senegal
2013–14 in Senegalese football
Senegal Premier League seasons